Isla Mágica (Magic Island) is a theme park in Seville, Spain. The park was constructed on the former grounds of the Expo '92 World's Fair and opened in June 1997. It features a large lake and many other attractions including roller coasters and various other types of rides as well as both live and cinematic shows.

The park's slogan is "Diversión sin límites" which translates as "Fun without Limits".

Main rides
Jaguar - The first inverted rollercoaster in Spain, with five inversions (2x heartline roll, 1x immelman and 2x in-line twist) and a final helix, and one of the most popular roller coasters in the park. It's an SLC+ (the second in the world and the first in Europe), a special edition with a helix before the brakes, by the Dutch manufacturer Vekoma.
Dimensión 4 - A 4D cinema, which shows films including "Haunted House", "SOS Earth" and "Fly me to the Moon"; by KraftWerk, 3DBA and Nwave.
Anaconda - A log flume ride, with three drops (8.1, 9.0 and 17.6 metres), by the German manufacturer Mack Rides.
Iguazú - A splash ride with a drop of 15 metres and more than 50 km/h; by manufacturer Intamin AG.
Rápidos del Orinoco - A river rapids ride with 500 metres length; by Intamin AG.
El Desafío - An a tended Power drop tower, themed around Seville, with an Islamic-style minaret in the station; by German manufacturer Maurer AG.

References

External links
Isla Mágica Official Website

Buildings and structures in Seville
Amusement parks in Spain
1997 establishments in Spain
World's fair sites in Seville
Tourist attractions in Seville
Seville Expo '92
Amusement parks opened in 1997